Allegis Group, Inc. is an international talent management firm headquartered in Hanover, Maryland, United States. As of 2018, it had  in revenue, and 19,000 employees. It ranks fourth in the world after Adecco, Randstad and Manpower Inc.

History 
Founded as Aerotek in 1983 by Jim C. Davis and Steve Bisciotti, the company originally focused on the engineering and aerospace industry. Davis remains Allegis Group's CEO today; Bisciotti would go on to become owner of the Baltimore Ravens.

Allegis Group's subsidiaries include:
 Aerotek
 Actalent (formerly Aerotek Engineering & Sciences and EASi)
 TEKsystems
 TEKsystems Global Services
 Aston Carter
 Allegis Global Solutions
 Major, Lindsey & Africa
 Allegis Partners
 MarketSource
 Getting Hired

Major, Lindsey & Africa
Major, Lindsey & Africa, a subsidiary of Allegis Group, is a legal and executive search firm, with headquarters in Hanover, Maryland. The firm was founded in 1982. Allegis Group acquired it in 2008.  It has legal recruiters in major United States markets, and in a number of international markets.

References

Companies based in Anne Arundel County, Maryland
Business services companies established in 1983
Temporary employment agencies
1983 establishments in Maryland
Privately held companies of the United States
Employment agencies of the United States
Executive search firms